Venancio Luis Sánchez Jiménez (born 18 May 1962) is a Mexican politician affiliated with the PRD. He served as Senator of the LXII Legislature of the Mexican Congress. He also served as Deputy during the LX Legislature.

References

1962 births
Living people
Politicians from the State of Mexico
Members of the Senate of the Republic (Mexico)
Members of the Chamber of Deputies (Mexico)
Party of the Democratic Revolution politicians
21st-century Mexican politicians
National Autonomous University of Mexico alumni